Dispose (stylized in all caps) is the fourth studio album by American rock band The Plot in You. The album was released on February 16, 2018, through Fearless Records. It was produced by Landon Tewers and Drew Fulk.

Background
On June 15, 2017, the band announced their signing with Fearless Records, and premiered a new song "Feel Nothing". The band worked with producer Drew Fulk, the first time they've worked with an outside producer on an album. The album was officially announced on November 19, 2017.

The lyrics on the album deal with singer Landon Tewers "detaching himself from a toxic relationship" and "explores the stages of said relationship". The album is the first by the band to be written and recorded as a full band, previous records were written and performed by Tewers entirely. The band wrote 20 songs in preparation for the album. Tewers drew inspiration from pop acts including Sevdaliza, Jorja Smith and The Weeknd when writing the album. The album features a departure from previous sound, with electronic instrumentation and "R&B-inspired" clean vocals.

Critical reception

Dispose received generally favorable critical reviews. The album drew many comparisons to That's the Spirit by Bring Me the Horizon due to the stylistic changes.

Track listing

Notes
 All track titles are stylized in capital letters.

Personnel
Credits adapted from Discogs.

The Plot in You
 Landon Tewers – vocals, keyboards, programming, guitars, production
 Josh Childress – guitars
 Ethan Yoder – bass
 Mathis Arnell – drums, percussion

Additional musicians
 Dean Tartaglia – saxophone (track 9)

Additional personnel
 Drew Fulk – engineering, mixing, production
 Mike Kalajian – mastering
 Micah Tewers – composition (track 1)
 Kristin Biskup – project management
 Andrew Jarrin and Cody Grup – management
 Eric Powell and Marco Walzel – booking
 Cody Demavivas – A&R
 Jonathan Weiner – photography

Charts

References

External links

Dispose at YouTube (streamed copy where licensed)

2018 albums
The Plot in You albums
Fearless Records albums